National University of Kyiv-Mohyla Academy ( NaUKMA) is a national,  research university located in Kyiv, Ukraine. The university takes its name from the institution cited as its main predecessor, the Kyiv-Mohyla Academy established in 1615 and operating until 1819. The NaUKMA is located on that Academy's grounds in the ancient Podil neighborhood. In 1991, the modern university was organized, and teaching began the following year. NaUKMA has the highest level of accreditation as outlined by the Ministry of Education and Science of Ukraine, and is one of the thirteen educational institutions in Ukraine having a status of a research and autonomous university. NaUKMA takes part in numerous international university collaborations, such as the European University Association. The university is bilingual in Ukrainian and English. It is one of Ukraine's few universities with internationally recognized diplomas.

With around 4000 students, NaUKMA is one of the smallest universities in Ukraine. Alumni of the Kyiv-Mohyla Academy played a formative role in the intellectual and church life of Ukraine and Russia in 17th and 18th centuries. Among the most notable alumni were hetman Ivan Mazepa and philosopher Hryhori Skovoroda. As well, Theophan Prokopovich as a rector of the Kyiv-Mogila Academy elaborated upon and implemented Peter the Great's reform of the Russian Orthodox Church. The university is known as pro-Western and served as headquarters for Orange Revolution activists.

History

Foundation of the Kyiv-Mohyla Academy

Today's National University of Kyiv-Mohyla Academy claims as its predecessor the Kyiv-Mohyla Academy, one of the oldest academic and theological schools amongst the Orthodox Christian countries of Eastern Europe. That Academy was first opened in 1615 as the school of the Kyiv bratstvo ("brotherhood"). When, in 1632, the Kyiv Pechersk Lavra school and Kyiv Brotherhood School merged they formed Kyiv's, and by extension Ukraine's, first institution of higher education. The newly formed 'collegium', then located in the Polish–Lithuanian Commonwealth was given the Polish name 'Mohylańska', in honour of Petro Mohyla, a key figure in bringing about the institution's foundation and proponent of modern Western educational standards at the academy.

In 1658 under the terms of the Treaty of Hadiach the Collegium obtained the status of an 'academy', similar to the Kraków Academy – at that time the Polish–Lithuanian Commonwealth's premier university.

From 1686 Kyiv came under Russian rule as a result of the Polish-Russian war. In 1694 the Collegium was also recognised as an academy by the Moscow Tsardom Tsar Ivan V; this was later reaffirmed by his brother and successor, Peter the Great. Subsequently, during the 17th and 18th centuries the academy was known for its education of the Russian and Ukrainian political and intellectual elites; it was highly acclaimed throughout Eastern Europe and accepted students of all classes and backgrounds from the territories of modern-day Ukraine, Russia, Poland, Belarus, Romania, Serbia, Bulgaria and Greece. In particular the hetmans – military leaders of the famed Zaporozhian Cossacks – were benefactors of and actively supported the Kyiv-Mohyla Academy. The school flourished under the term of Hetman Ivan Mazepa, an alumnus, and was later able to support the foundation of a number of other colleges built on its model, such as the Vasilian College in Moldavia.

Due to the exceptional quality of the language program many of the Kyiv-Mohyla Academy's students continued their education abroad, which at the time meant many of them were required to convert from the Orthodox faith to Roman Catholicism. Despite this, many returning alumni readopted the Orthodox religion, as this was necessary in order to attain positions in the clergy or Academia. By sending so many of its graduates abroad the Kyiv-Mohyla Academy played a vital role in facilitating the transfer of knowledge eastwards cross Europe and popularising the Renaissance both in Ukraine and Russia.

Closure and reopening as the Kyiv Theological Academy

By the late 18th century Kyiv and its surrounding lands had become part of the Russian Empire and in 1817 Tsar Alexander I of Russia made the decision to close the academy. In response to this move a large number of the academy's alumni petitioned the monarch, albeit unsuccessfully, to turn the Kyiv-Mohyla Academy into a formal university. Instead, in 1819, the academy was turned over to the church and transformed into the Kiev Theological Academy - a purely clerical institution. During this time, admission to the Academy was open only to children of the existing clergy and key positions were held mostly by alumni of the Saint Petersburg Seminary.

With the passing years the need for a new, modern, institution of the higher education in Kyiv became apparent and the Tsar's ministers began to consider the establishment of such a school. It would, however, take a long time before the actual opening of a university in the city and when it finally did occur it did not come in the form of a reopened Kyiv-Mohyla Academy but in the foundation of an entirely new secular university - the Saint Vladimir University (founded in 1834 on the orders of the Tsar Nicholas I.

During the Soviet era

With the success of the October Revolution of 1917 and subsequent establishment of the Soviet Union, atheism became the only state sanctioned belief system and the church (along with its associated organs) were repressed. Shortly thereafter the authorities of the newly proclaimed Ukrainian Soviet Socialist Republic ordered the closure of the Kyiv Theological Academy; its library was later plundered and the main church of the school, the Bogoyavlenskiy Cathedral, was demolished with explosives in 1935.

The premises of the disbanded theological college were later used for a new Soviet military education facility - the Kyiv Higher Naval Political School - the only naval academy that trained specialist political commissars for the Soviet Navy. To this day one of the university's buildings still bears a mosaic portraying a warship, academic badge and open book displaying quotes by Vladimir Lenin; upon the reestablishment of NaUKMA in 1992 a conscious decision was made to retain this mosaic as a visible reminder of the site's prior usage and totalitarian past.

Since Ukrainian independence

Following Perestroika and the fall of the USSR in 1991, the Kyiv-Mohyla Academy was reestablished. This was made possible through the efforts of Vyacheslav Bryukhovetsky - a high-profile Ukrainian academic - who later became the first president of the 'National University of Kyiv-Mohyla Academy' (NaUKMA). The reestablished institution became the first Ukrainian educational institution to be modelled on and structured according to the basic concepts of the North American higher educational system, with bachelor's and Master's degrees offered according to the requirements of an academic credit system.

On 24 August 1992 – the first anniversary of Ukraine's independence, the first cohort of students matriculated at NaUKMA, and by June 1995 the first six graduates of the reborn Kyiv-Mohyla Academy had received their degrees. Since then, NaUKMA's reputation for academic excellence has become well known throughout Ukraine; the university is now consistently ranked as one of the country's top educational institutions.

In 1994 NaUKMA was a key lobbyist for and partner in the revival of another historically noteworthy Ukrainian educational institution, the Ostroh Academy. Today the Ostroh Academy maintains strong links to NaUKMA and, in the year 2000, joined it as one of Ukraine's 19 'national' research universities.

The NaUKMA widely got to be known for being the first university of which students and professors (among the other parties of the Orange Revolution in Kyiv) openly protested against the massive electoral selection fraud during the Ukrainian presidential election in 2004. After those events a museum dedicated to the Orange Revolution (Pomarancheva Revolyuziya-ukr.) was opened at the NaUKMA.

Claims of continuity with the old Kyiv-Mohyla Academy
Based on its location on the territory of the ancient Mohyla Academy, NaUKMA claims to be the oldest institution of higher education in Kyiv and all of Ukraine. However this is disputed on the grounds that NaUKMA has formally existed as a modern university (with a different focus and structure) only since 1991, without any clear continuity during a long break of 174 years in its history. The modern National University of Ostroh Academy has a similar history of revival, taking its name from Ostroh Academy (dating to 1576) which is considered to be the first institution of higher education in the territory of present-day Ukraine.

Another claimant to the title of  oldest institution of higher education in Ukraine is Lviv University, founded in 1661, which holds the undisputed record for being the oldest continuously operating university in Ukraine. Taras Shevchenko National University of Kyiv (established in 1834) is the oldest continuously operating higher educational institution in the nation's capital, Kyiv.

Besides NaUKMA, there are two modern theological schools which claim continuity with the academic traditions of the old Kyiv-Mohyla Academy. These are the Kyiv Theological Academy and Seminary of the Ukrainian Orthodox Church (Moscow Patriarchate) and the Kyiv Orthodox Theological Academy of the Ukrainian Orthodox Church (Kyiv Patriarchate).

The Research Center "Legacy of Kyiv-Mohyla Academy" was founded in 1992 to research the history of the Mohyla Academy and promote NaUKMA's claim to continuity with the traditions of the old Mohyla Academy.

Academics

Profile
NaUKMA holds the highest accreditation level given by the Ministry of Education and Science of Ukraine and is organized similarly to North American post-secondary institutions. The academic year runs on a trimester system with the longer fall and spring trimesters and a short summer trimester. Fall and spring terms include an extra week of independent study which is aimed to assist students needing to catch up with their coursework and prepare for exams. During undergraduate study students have an academic major and can choose either a minor or electives. Each course is assigned a number of credits based on credit hours and grading is done on a 100-point scale.

NaUKMA Bachelor's degree holders can continue their studies in any of the Masters programs at the university. Graduate academic programs leading to a Master of Business Administration, Candidate of Science (PhD) and Doctor of Science are also offered at NaUKMA. The university was first in Ukraine to join the reforms of the doctoral education within the Bologna process.

NaUKMA is a bilingual institution with Ukrainian and English being the languages of instruction, although the primary language is Ukrainian. The university offers business courses in English to the general public, in partnership with Grant MacEwan College of Edmonton, Alberta, Canada. NaUKMA organizes an annual summer school in Ukrainian studies for international students and an English-language term program for international students entitled "Transitional studies: Ukraine and post-soviet space". Recently a Master program "German and European studies" is offered in collaboration with the University of Jena. The program is offered in German.

Similarly to other public universities in Ukraine, students receive modest monthly scholarship payments from the government. The amount varies according to the student's grades in the previous trimester. Additionally, a number of private scholarships are given to the best students on a merit system. Further, students are rewarded scholarship money for their social activities, thus awards are given to those who make the greatest contribution to the revival of NaUKMA or to those who excel in the promotion of Ukrainian language and culture.

NaUKMA is a state university and governed by the Supervising Board appointed by the Government of Ukraine. The highest university official is the President of NaUKMA, who is Prof. Serhiy M. Kvit. Education and research at the university are coordinated by the Scientific Board. Several public bodies consult the management of the university. These include the International Consulting Board, Board of Trustees, Student Council and Arts Board.

Admissions

Admission to NaUKMA is open to both Ukrainian and international applicants. Admission is granted based on entrance examination scores. Entrance exams are administered as multiple choice tests covering several subjects including Ukrainian, English, law, mathematics, history of the Kyiv-Mohyla Academy, humanities (literature or history) and natural science, with the tests being machine scored. The admissions procedure was introduced in order to stem alleged corruption in the admission process. Admission tests are considered challenging and cover a broader range of subjects than the typical entrance examinations held at the majority of other universities in Ukraine. Testing the knowledge of history of the Kyiv-Mohyla Academy is exceptional among Ukrainian universities. It was introduced because of the role of the university in Ukrainian history. The university also has a Department of Preuniversity Training, which organizes test preparation courses for prospective students as well as trial testing sessions.

Reputation

In 2009 Delovoy magazine ranked NaUKMA as the second best university in Ukraine, being nationally the strongest in humanities, third best in economics and second best in law. According to the independent ranking of 228 universities in Ukraine performed by Compas, NaUKMA was ranked second best in Ukraine regarding the adequacy of alumni to the labor market of Ukraine. In 2007, both the Ministry of Education and Science of Ukraine and the Dzerkalo Tyzhnia, a weekly national newspaper ranked NaUKMA in third place among the Ukrainian universities. Likewise, the university's business school has the best reputation in the country. The Delovoy magazine ranked the Kyiv Mohyla Business School as the best business school in Ukraine in 2007. NaUKMA was ranked as number four in the ranking "Top-200 Ukraine" conducted by UNESCO in 2007.

In the international Webometrics Ranking of World Universities the university features at 2,055 out of 8,000 ranked institutions and second best among Ukrainian universities.

NaUKMA often hosts visits of foreign and national politicians. Among the latest visitors were Jaap de Hoop Scheffer, Alejandro Toledo, David Kilgour and Jean Chrétien.

NaUKMA in the rankings of universities in Ukraine:

Institutions associated with NaUKMA
Following its reestablishment, NaUKMA has been active in the revival and founding of institutions sharing a common vision of educational standards. Thus, NaUKMA assisted with the development of the National University of Ostroh Academy, the Taras Shevchenko Pedagogical University of Kremenets, and the Petro Mohyla State University of Mykolayiv until they became separate independent universities. However, these schools still share a common admissions system with NaUKMA. Moreover, NaUKMA is an umbrella institution for a network of high schools throughout Ukraine called the collegiums. The curricula of collegiums aim to prepare the students for the NaUKMA entrance exams.

The university publishing house "Kyiv-Mohyla Academy", which specializes in publishing scientific and educational literature in Ukraine, is situated on the NaUKMA campus.

Foreign Partner Universities

The university maintains relations with a number of partner universities both through formal bilateral agreements and schemes like Erasmus Mundus. Current bilateral agreements are outlined below.

Research
Science at NaUKMA is organized into six faculties, 29 departments and 24 research centers. An annual scientific conference Dni Nauky NaUKMA (The Days of Science at NaUKMA) takes place in the last week of January. The main focus of research at the NaUKMA is in the fields of economics, law and humanities. Many faculty members hold permanent positions at the research institutes of the National Academy of Science of Ukraine and NaUKMA students are allowed to use its facilities for scientific and educational purposes.

Libraries

The library of the old Kyiv Mohyla Academy contained a notable collection of the books. However, the archive was plundered in 1920s when the academy was closed. The university administration focuses on creating a research library equipped to modern standards. In addition to the central undergraduate library there is a number of the departmental libraries as well as reading halls for research and periodicals. Further, several international cultural organizations such as the Goethe-Institute, British Council and, American Library are located on campus premises and are open to the public. Also all the NaUKMA students have an access to the Vernadsky National Library of Ukraine.

Campus

The university occupies the grounds of the Kyiv-Mohyla Academy in the Podil neighborhood, from Kontraktova Square to the Dnieper River. The campus of NaUKMA is composed of a number of buildings constructed in the times of its predecessor institutions. The oldest buildings date from the 17th century, and include the Halshka Hulevychivna house and the old academic building also called the Mazepa building in honor of its financier Hetman Ivan Mazepa. The Mazepa building contains the congregation hall for ceremonial events, the Center for Contemporary Art and the research library.

In the same neighborhood is the historical museum complex of the Kyiv-Mohyla Academy, although the building is undergoing renovation. The complex contains a sundial and the house of Halshka Hulevychivna, which was the first building of the Kyiv Brotherhood School. Another historical building called the bursa faces the Dnieper River and was used as a student dormitory during the time of the Kyiv-Mohyla Academy. The Blahovishchenska (Annunciation) Church built in 1740 for students is also on the NaUKMA campus. Most other buildings were constructed during the time of Kyiv Theological Academy with some additions made during the Soviet era. The dormitories are situated outside the main campus. The largest one is situated in Troyeshchyna (14B Marina Tsvetaeva Street). The second largest is located at the Kharkiv highway, 17. Another one dormitory, a few years ago, transferred to the property of the academy, is located at 31A John McCain Street. The last, and the most remote is located at urban village Vorzel, 6A Klenova Street (masters and postgraduate students are mostly settled here).

An environmentally-friendly office called the Green Office was recently opened at the Department of Environmental Studies at NaUKMA and uses modern energy-saving and environmentally friendly technologies. The project was largely the initiative of students and is the first example of an office-based on sustainable development in a Ukrainian educational institution.

University traditions

Following reestablishment, the NaUKMA academic community has attempted to restore the traditions of its predecessor. However, during NaUKMA's reincarnation, several new traditions have been founded. Every year on 15 October the school celebrates Academy day and NaUKMA students wash the monument of the noted Kyiv-Mohyla alumnus philosopher Hryhorii Skovoroda. This action is called clean Skovoroda. The monument of Skovoroda in front of the university is also decorated with a mortarboard during the annual graduation ceremony held on 28 June. Another tradition during the ceremony is to carry the university turtle named Alma around the new graduates who make wishes while touching her shell. A student tradition connecting the old Kyiv-Mohyla Academy and NaUKMA is theatrical performances called .  possibly were introduced by the students of the old Academy. They are performed during different festive events. Lastly, it is a tradition to open each academic year with a welcome event for the new students, followed by a lecture by a renowned scientist, who is given an honorary professorship at the University. The ceremony of new NaUKMA student initiation includes taking a traditional student oath. During the first term at NaUKMA, students of all faculties introduce themselves to the academic community during the acquaintance ball.

Student life
Despite the relatively small number of NaUKMA students (about 3000 in 2006) there are a number of extracurricular activities on campus. NaUKMA students are also known for their activism, which is also supported by the university administration. Notable among the student organizations on campus are: the Student Council, the Christian Students Union, Mohyla Intellectual Club, the Student Brotherhood, the ecological club Zelena Hvylya, and the Youth Center for Humanities. The NaUKMA student portal Bo.Net.Ua is an online platform for student and alumni communication.

Sports courses are compulsory for NaUKMA students in their two years of study. These courses include elements of calisthenics, sport (soccer, basketball, volleyball and swimming) and fitness exercises. Additionally, there are a number of student sport groups ranging from Combat Hopak to Go.

Arts and music at NaUKMA are represented by the Center of Culture and Art and the Center for Contemporary Art.

Kyiv-Mohyla Academy in literature and popular culture

Kyiv-Mohyla Academy is mentioned in a number of novels. The main characters of Nikolai Gogol's novel Taras Bulba Ostap and Andriy Bulba were alumni of the old Kyiv-Mohyla Academy. Kyiv-Mohyla Collegium is mentioned in several novels by Pavlo Zahrebelnyi including Southern Comfort and I, Bohdan. Kyiv Theological Academy is mentioned in Nikolai Leskov's Pecherskie antiki. Student life in the contemporary Kyiv-Mohyla Academy is described in a novel High school student. Freshman (Старшокласниця. Першокурсниця) by Anastasiya Levkova. Protagonist of the "Myth and Madness" novel by Daniel Hryhorczuk is a PhD student of Kyiv-Mohyla Academy during Euromaidan.

To note the importance of the university in Ukraine's history, a postage stamp dedicated to Kyiv-Mohyla Academy and its revival was issued in 1992. Moreover, a building of Kyiv-Mohyla Academy is portrayed on the 500 hryven' banknote.

Notable alumni and faculty members

Alumni of the old Kyiv-Mohyla Academy have played an important role in Ukrainian professional life. Many hetmans of Zaporozhian Cossacks, political leaders of Ukraine in the 17th and 18th centuries, were educated here. These include Ivan Mazepa, Pylyp Orlyk, Pavlo Polubotok, Ivan Skoropadsky and Ivan Samoylovych. The Grand Chancellor of Russia Alexander Bezborodko was of Ukrainian origin and an alumnus. The Kyiv-Mohyla Academy was a religious school of note in the Orthodox world and archbishops of the Russian Empire such as Stephen Yavorsky and Feofan Prokopovich as well as the metropolitan bishop of Rostov Dimitry of Rostov were all alumni.

More recently, several generations of writers, artists and scholars have been schooled at the Kyiv Mohyla Academy. Examples include writer Simeon of Polotsk, architect Ivan Hryhorovych-Barskyi, and composer Artemy Vedel. Ukrainian philosopher Hryhori Skovoroda was another alumnus of the university. Mikhail Lomonosov, Russian scientist and founder of Moscow University was briefly a student at Kyiv Mohyla Academy.

After 1819, when the university was turned into a purely religious institution, it still upheld its international reputation and has been an alma mater for the Moldavian poet Alexei Mateevici and metropolitan bishop of the Romanian Orthodox Church Visarion Puiu.

Alumni of NaUKMA are employed by national and international companies, research and governmental institutions and many graduates continue their studies abroad. Journalist and politician Andriy Shevchenko, Ukrainian writer Myroslav Laiuk and the contemporary Ukrainian writer Maryna Sokolyan studied at NaUKMA.

See also

Economics Education and Research Consortium
List of universities, colleges, and research institutions in Kyiv
Open access in Ukraine

References

Further reading

Omeljan Pritsak and Ihor Sevcenko, eds. "The Kyiv Mohyla Academy (Commemorating the 350th Anniversary of Its Founding, 1632–1982)." Harvard Ukrainian Studies. vol. VIII, no. 1/2. Cambridge, MA, 1985.
S.M. Horak. "The Kiev Academy. A Bridge to Europe in the 17th century". East European Quarterly, vol. 2, 2, 1968.
V. Brioukhovetsky. "National University of Kyiv-Mohyla Academy: symbol of the rebirth of Ukraine". The Ukrainian Weekly, Sunday, 22 November 1998.
Interview with Vyacheslav Bryukhovetsky, president of Kyiv Mohyla Academy. Welcome to Ukraine, 1, 2006.
O. Ilchenko. "The Once and Future University Kyiv Mohyla Academy, the First Educational Establishment in Eastern Europe". Welcome to Ukraine, 1, 2000.
"Vivat Academia", Welcome to Ukraine, 3, 1999.
S. Makhun. "'Kyiv-Mohyla Academy' National University of Ukraine: Citadel of European Spirit and Ukrainian Enlightenment". The Day, 22 October 2002.
Kyivan Mohyla Academy in the Encyclopedia of Ukraine.
History of Kyiv-Mohyla Academy.
Additional literature in the Ukrainian version of this article.

External links

NaUKMA homepage
NaUKMA campus map
Wikimapia – Satellite view of NaUKMA
Admissions to NaUKMA for international applicants
NaUKMA International Office
NaUKMA photo gallery
Kyiv Mohyla Foundation of America
Architecture and photographs of Kyiv Mohyla Academy campus 

 
1632 establishments in the Polish–Lithuanian Commonwealth
Educational institutions established in the 1630s
Educational institutions established in 1991
Universities and colleges in Kyiv
1991 establishments in Ukraine
Podilskyi District
National universities in Ukraine